Claudell Overton (December 16, 1927 – April 29, 1996) was an American professional basketball player. Overton was selected in the fifth round (52nd overall) of the 1950 NBA draft by the Washington Capitols after a collegiate career at East Central. He played for the Philadelphia Warriors in 15 total games in 1952–53.

References

1927 births
1996 deaths
American men's basketball players
East Central Tigers men's basketball players
Philadelphia Warriors players
Shooting guards
Washington Capitols draft picks
Waterloo Hawks players
Wilkes-Barre Barons players